Symington is a small village in South Lanarkshire, Scotland,  southwest of Biggar,  east of Douglas and  southeast of Carluke. Geographical features near Symington include Tinto Hill, the Coulter Hills and the River Clyde.
A map by Pont in 1596 showed two St John's Kirks in a small settlement, and another map by Roy in 1754 showed a mill to the east.

History
Its successor was the Caledonian Railway Main Line.

Recognition
Symington was painted by John Pairman of Biggar around 1830.

See also
Symington, South Ayrshire
Symington Family Estates
List of places in South Lanarkshire
List of places in Scotland

References

External links 

History
RCAHMS record for Symington House
RCAHMS record for Symington, Manse Road, Symington Mill
Gazetteer for Scotland: Symington
National Archives: Symington, Biggar and Broughton Railway
National Archives: Symington Parochial Board/Parish Council
National Archives: Symington School Board
British Listed Buildings: Symington House
Vision of Britain: Symington

Local government and Services
South Lanarkshire Council: Tinto Primary school and Nursery Class, Symington, HM Inspection , April 2009
Local By-elections
Symington Kirk
Symington Weather Station

Recreation
SportFocus: Symington Tinto Amateur Football League

Villages in South Lanarkshire